The Five Ranks is a poem consisting of five stanzas describing the stages of realization in the practice of Zen Buddhism. It expresses the interplay of absolute and relative truth and the fundamental non-dualism of Buddhist teaching.

Origins
The ranks are referenced in the Song of the Precious Mirror Samadhi. This work is attributed to the Chinese monk Dongshan Liangjie (Japanese: Tōzan Ryōkan), who lived during the end of Tang Dynasty, as well as two sets of verse commentaries by him. The teachings of the Five Ranks may be inspired by the Sandokai, a poem attributed to Shitou Xiqian (traditional Chinese: 石頭希遷).

The work is highly significant in both the Caodong/Sōtō and Linji/Rinzai schools of Zen that exist today. Eihei Dogen, the founder of the Japanese Sōtō School, references the Five Ranks in the first paragraph of one of his most widely studied works, Genjōkōan. Hakuin integrated the Five Ranks in his system of koan-teaching.

Ranks
The Five Ranks are listed below with two translations of the original poem, one by Miura and Sasaki on the left, and the other by Thomas Cleary on the right, followed by commentary and analysis:

I: The Relative within the Absolute

This rank describes the Absolute, insight into the empty nature or not-"thing"-ness of everything.  The scholar Heinrich Dumoulin describes the first rank as the realization that "all diverse things and events are in their essence the same, formless and empty. Emptiness is undisturbed by any subjective element". According to Hakuin, this rank is only the beginning of Zen insight, but it can become a trapping for people who take the absolute to be the end-station: "Although inside and out may be perfectly clear as long as you are hidden away in an unfrequented place where there is absolute quiet and nothing to do, yet you are powerless as soon as perception touches upon different worldly situations, with all their clamor and emotion, and you are beset by a plethora of miseries".

II: The Absolute within the Relative

The second rank describes the recognition of the Absolute within "the midst of the variety of different situations in action; you see everything before your eyes as your own original true clean face, just as if you were looking at your face in the mirror". That is, unlike the insight of the first rank, which can be easily disturbed, the second rank has greater constancy in the face of distractions. However, seeing the absolute within the relative does not extend to one's behavior towards others. Hakuin describes that at this point one "is neither conversant with the deportment of the bodhisattva, nor does he understand the causal conditions for a Buddha-land. Although he has a clear understanding of the Universal and True Wisdom, he cannot cause to shine forth the Marvelous Wisdom that comprehends the unobstructed interpenetration of the manifold dharmas."

III: Coming from within the Absolute

This rank describes enlightened behaviour: "Enlightened beings do not dwell in the state of result they have realized; from the ocean of effortlessness, they radiate unconditional compassion".

IV: Arrival at Mutual Integration

The fourth rank describes "the bodhisattva of indomitable spirit" who "go into the marketplace extending their hands, acting for others". It is powerful enlightened behaviour. "This is what is called being on the road without leaving home, leaving home without being on the road. Is this an ordinary person? Is this a sage? Demons and outsiders cannot discern such a person; even Buddhas and Zen masters can do nothing". But even this  "cannot be considered the place to sit in peace [...] You must know there is another rank, attainment in both".

V: Unity Attained

The fifth rank describes "the mellow maturity of consciousness". According to Sekida, this rank is described in case 13 of the Mumonkan:

Interplay of Absolute and Relative

When Buddhism was introduced to China, the Two Truths doctrine was a point of confusion. Chinese thinking took this to refer to two ontological truths: reality exists of two modalities. The doctrines of Buddha-nature and Sunyata were understood as akin to Dao and the Taoist non-being.  It was centuries later that Chinese Buddhism took Sunyata to mean the underlying unchanging essence of reality, the non-duality of being and non-being.

In Madhyamaka the Two Truths are two epistemological truths: two different ways to look at reality, a relative truth and an ultimate truth. The Prajnaparamita-sutras  and Madhyamaka emphasized the non-duality of form and emptiness: form is emptiness, emptiness is form, as the heart sutra says. The ultimate truth in Madhyamaka is the truth that everything is empty (Sunyata), that which is an underlying unchanging essence. Sunyata itself is also "empty," 'the emptiness of emptiness', which means that Sunyata itself does not constitute a higher or ultimate "essence" or "reality."

Based on their understanding of the Mahayana Mahaparinirvana Sutra the Chinese supposed that the teaching of the Buddha-nature was, as stated by that sutra, the final Buddhist teaching, and that there is an essential truth above Sunyata and the Two Truths. The idea that ultimate reality is present within the daily world of relative reality melded well with Chinese culture, which emphasized the mundane world and society. But this does not tell how the absolute is present in the relative world:

This question is answered in such schemata as the Five Ranks and the Oxherding Pictures. Various terms are used for "absolute" and "relative."

See also
 Ten Bulls
 Four ways of knowing
 Lamrim
 Four stages of enlightenment
 Bodhisattva Stages
 Enlightenment in Buddhism
 Subitism
 Essence-Function

Notes

References

Sources

Printed sources

Web-sources

Further reading

External links
 The Five Ranks of Tozan
 Visual Schematics and Symbolism of the Five Ranks
 Teisho on The Five Ranks by Shunryu Suzuki
 Dale Verkuilen: Dogen and the Five Ranks
 
 
 
 

Soto Zen
Stage theories
Nondualism
Kōan